Phyllonorycter lonicerae is a moth of the family Gracillariidae. It is known from the islands of Honshu, Shikoku and Kyushu in Japan and from China.

The wingspan is 6–7 mm.

The larvae feed as leaf miners on Lonicera japonica. The mine is slightly tentiform and located on the lower surface of the leaf.

References

lonicerae
Moths of Asia

Moths of Japan
Insects of China
Moths described in 1963
Taxa named by Tosio Kumata
Leaf miners